The 42nd Home Guard Infantry Division (also ), nicknamed the Devil's Division (Croatian: Vražja divizija) was an infantry division of the Royal Croatian Home Guard within the Austro-Hungarian Army which was active in World War I.

Formation history

It numbered 14,000 troops. At the start of war, the 42nd division was commanded by Stjepan Sarkotić, an ethnic Croat officer from the Military Border born near Otočac. Its regiments  were granted the right to use Serbo-Croatian as the official language of command instead of German or Hungarian.

The division was known for its terrible crimes, including rape, torture and murder against the Serbian populations of Western Serbia. It took part in the Serbian Campaign of 1914 as part of the XIII Corps, first in Syrmia, in Mačva, then during the seven-day battle for Šabac as well as the battles of Cer and Kolubara. On November 11, 1914 Sarkotić was replaced by Johann von Salis-Seewis who led the division during the second Serbian offensive. After the failure of the campaign, it was redeployed at the beginning of 1915 in Galicia on the Eastern front along with the rest of the XIII. Corps. On 22 June 1915 Salis-Seewis was replaced, while he was on leave, by Anton Lipošćak before the Russian Empire launched the Brusilov offensive. On 25 June 1917  took command of the division.

Legacy
During World War II, after the 369th Croatian Reinforced Infantry Regiment, a unit of the Wehrmacht composed of Croat and Bosniak (Bosnian Muslim) volunteers under a mostly German command, was annihilated during the battle of Stalingrad, it was reformed as the 369th Croatian Infantry Division with the nickname of Devil’s Division in honour of the 42nd Home Guard Infantry Division of World War I.

Commanders
 Stjepan Sarkotić - 1912 to 1914
 Johann Salis Seewis - 1915
 Anton Lipošćak - 1915 to 1917
  - 1917

References

Sources
 Order of Battle - Serbia August, 1914 
 Disposition Of The Austro-hungarian Army 1914-1918

Military history of Croatia
Military units and formations of Austria-Hungary in World War I
Infantry divisions of World War I
Royal Croatian Home Guard